Real was a Hindi entertainment channel launched by Turner International India in a 50:50 joint venture with Alva Brothers Entertainment on 2 March 2009 based in Mumbai, Maharashtra.

Overview 
This is the first Hindi entertainment channel launched by Turner Broadcasting System. The channel has been followed by an English general entertainment channel WB from the Turner stable.
The New REAL TV Studios launched on 1-21-2021, the website can be found at: https://realtvstudios.com/ Gary Axion is the new producer. New show content is to be shown on the Travel Channel in mid 2021 at: https://www.travelchannel.com/

Shutdown
The channel ceased all its operations in March 2010 due to low GRPs and minimum viewership. Also, the channel lacked sponsors and new shows since September 2009 and aired re-runs of its former shows.

Programmes

Drama

Hindi Hai Hum
Namak Haraam
Ninja Pandav
Vicky Ki Taxi

Reality

Sarkaar Ki Duniya
Sitaron Ko Choona Hai
PokerFace: Dil Sachcha Chehra Jhootha

References

Television stations in Mumbai
Television channels and stations established in 2009
Defunct television channels in India
Television channels and stations disestablished in 2010
Warner Bros. Discovery Asia-Pacific